The white sardinella (Sardinella albella), also known as deep-bodied sardine, perforated-scale sardine or short-bodied sardine, is a species of ray-finned fish in the genus Sardinella. It is an important food fish, which can be feed as dried, salted, or fresh forms.

Description
It is distributed throughout the Indo-West Pacific oceans from Madagascar, around India, Sri Lanka, and eastward to Indonesia, Taiwan and south to Papua New Guinea.
 
It is a small schooling fish found in depth of 20-50m. Maximum length do not exceed 21.5 cm. The fish has 13 to 21 dorsal soft rays and 12 to 23 anal soft rays. There is a dark spot at origin part of dorsal fin. It feeds on small planktons.

See also
List of common commercial fish of Sri Lanka

References 

IUCN Red List
WoRMS
Prevalence of Nerocila depressa (Isopoda, Cymothoidae) on Sardinella albella from a Thai estuary

albella
Fish described in 1847